Cipher Prime is a video game development studio based in Philadelphia. The company was founded in 2008. Cipher Prime is best known for its titles Auditorium (2008), Fractal (2010), and Splice (2012). They are currently working on a Kickstarter-backed sequel to Auditorium titled Auditorium 2: Duet. Since 2012, Cipher Prime has been hosting their own monthly Game Jams on Thursday nights in their Philadelphia offices. In 2013 they enlarged their office to create the Philly Game Forge, a coworking space for independent game developers. Several of their games have been featured in Humble Bundles, including Humble Bundles With Android 4 and 6.

List of video games

References

External links 
 

American companies established in 2008
Video game development companies
2008 establishments in Pennsylvania
Companies based in Philadelphia
Video game companies of the United States
Video game companies established in 2008